Nicholas William Mayo (born August 18, 1997) is an American professional basketball player for Hiroshima Dragonflies of the B.League. He played college basketball for the Eastern Kentucky Colonels and left as the program's all-time leading scorer.

High school career
Mayo played basketball for Messalonskee High School in Oakland, Maine. As a senior, he averaged 24.4 points, 13.6 rebounds, 3.1 assists and three blocks per game, leading his team to the Eastern Maine Class A semifinals. Mayo was named Maine Gatorade Player of the Year and was a finalist for the Mr. Maine Basketball award.

College career
Mayo was a four-year starter at Eastern Kentucky. He was named first-team All-Ohio Valley Conference (OVC) four times, joining Ralph Crosthwaite as the only players to ever achieve the feat. Mayo scored 2,316 career points, making him Eastern Kentucky's all-time leading scorer and ranking fifth in OVC history. He also became his school's all-time leader in blocks. As a senior, Mayo averaged 23.7 points, 8.7 rebounds, and 1.8 blocks per game, and led the OVC in free throw percentage (86.4%).

Professional career
After going undrafted in the 2019 NBA draft, Mayo joined the Miami Heat for 2019 NBA Summer League. On July 19, 2019, he signed his first professional contract with Chiba Jets Funabashi of the Japanese B.League. In 19 games, he averaged 14.6 points and 5.6 rebounds per game. Mayo signed with Levanga Hokkaido of the B.League on July 29, 2020. He was named player of the week on November 17, after recording 37 points, six rebounds and three assists in a win against the Niigata Albirex BB. Mayo signed with the Hiroshima Dragonflies in September 2021.

Career statistics

B.League

|-
| style="text-align:left;"| 2019–20
| style="text-align:left;"| Chiba
| 19 || 6 || 24.4 || .507 || .333 || .836 || 5.6 || .9 || 1.1 || .9 || 14.6
|- class="sortbottom"
| style="text-align:center;" colspan="2"| Career
| 19 || 6 || 24.4 || .507 || .333 || .836 || 5.6 || .9 || 1.1 || .9 || 14.6

College

|-
| style="text-align:left;"| 2015–16
| style="text-align:left;"| Eastern Kentucky
|| 31 || 31 || 29.8 || .607 || .556 || .802 || 4.9 || 1.1 || .6 || 1.1 || 14.5
|-
| style="text-align:left;"| 2016–17 
| style="text-align:left;"| Eastern Kentucky
|| 31 || 31 || 35.2 || .504 || .390 || .774 || 6.5 || 2.8 || .9 || 1.4 || 18.5
|-
| style="text-align:left;"| 2017–18 
| style="text-align:left;"| Eastern Kentucky 
|| 31 || 31 || 34.3 || .526 || .446 || .839 || 6.7 || 2.2 || .8 || 1.5 || 18.0
|-
| style="text-align:left;"| 2018–19
| style="text-align:left;"| Eastern Kentucky
|| 31 || 30 || 34.8 || .462 || .331 || .864 || 8.7 || 2.3 || 1.2 || 1.8 || 23.7
|- class="sortbottom"
| style="text-align:center;" colspan="2"| Career
|| 124 || 123 || 33.5 || .514 || .387 || .824 || 6.7 || 2.1 || .9 || 1.4 || 18.7

References

External links
Eastern Kentucky Colonels bio

1997 births
Living people
American expatriate basketball people in Japan
American men's basketball players
Basketball players from Maine
Chiba Jets Funabashi players
Levanga Hokkaido players
Eastern Kentucky Colonels men's basketball players
People from Oakland, Maine
Power forwards (basketball)